National Route 356 is a national highway of Japan connecting Chōshi, Chiba and Abiko, Chiba in Japan, with a total length of 91.7 km (56.98 mi).

References

National highways in Japan
Roads in Chiba Prefecture